The rolling stock preserved on the West Somerset Railway is used to operate trains on the West Somerset Railway (WSR), a heritage railway in Somerset, England. There is a variety of preserved steam and diesel locomotives and diesel multiple units, passenger coaches and goods wagons. Most of these are typical of Great Western Railway (GWR) branch lines in Somerset, or of the Somerset and Dorset Joint Railway (SDJR). Some are owned by the railway itself but most are owned by various individuals or voluntary groups such as the West Somerset Railway Association (WSRA), Diesel and Electric Preservation Group (DEPG), and Somerset and Dorset Railway Trust (SDRT). The line is also regularly visited by locomotives based elsewhere. Some come for a day on a railtour, others for a few days or weeks to take part in a special gala, but a few stay for many months and form part of the stock working scheduled trains. Over the years these have included well known locomotives such as City of Truro, Taw Valley, Duke of Gloucester, Evening Star, Royal Scot, Tornado, Bittern, Britannia, Sir Lamiel and King Edward I.

Maintenance facilities

The old goods shed at  has been converted to an engine shed for inspections and running repairs to the operational locomotives.

Restoration and heavy repairs are undertaken at several locations, including workshops attached to the engine sheds at Minehead and Williton.

Main line steam locomotives
The following locomotives are currently based on the West Somerset Railway but may sometimes be away from the line.

Main line diesels

Shunting locomotives

Diesel multiple units

In the early years a number of two-car sets were operated. Each was formed of a motor brake second (DMBS) and driving trailer composite (DTC), although sometimes they were formed into four-car trains. The first two sets were British Rail Class 103 built by Park Royal Vehicles (DMBSs 50413 and 50414, DTCs 56168 and 56169). These were later joined by two Gloucester-built Class 100s (50341 and 51118, 56097 and 56099) and a Cravens Class 105 (51482, 56121). Two further Class 115 DMBSs have also been on the railway. The body of 51663 has been stripped off this but the chassis is in store at Dunster for future use. 51852 was purchased by the WSRA as a spare driving car in 1994 but sold to the Dean Forest Railway for spares in 2011.

Former WSR locomotives and DMUs
Note that the locations given may not be current as locomotives move between railways from time to time.

Steam
The first main line steam locomotive to operate on the line when it reopened in 1976 was 6400 Class 6412 which was purchased from the Dart Valley Railway and sold back to the South Devon Railway Trust in 2008. During its time on the West Somerset Railway it carried Flockton Flyer nameplates for a while after appearing in the television series of that name. Other steam locomotives that have been on the railway but now gone elsewhere include GWR 2251 Class 3205 which is now on the South Devon Railway, BR Standard Class 4 2-6-4T 80136, and LB&SCR 'Terrier' 32678 Knowle. This had been displayed at the Butlins holiday camp at Minehead from 1964 until 1975; restoration was started at Minehead but was completed by the Kent and East Sussex Railway.

Many of the trains operated in the early years of the West Somerset Railway were hauled by one of two identical Bagnall 0-6-0ST locomotives that had been designed for the Steel Company of Wales’ Margam Steelworks in 1951. They were Vulcan (works number 2994) and Victor (2996). Both have since left the railway. Other industrial locomotives that have also moved elsewhere were Hudswell Clarke  Jennifer (1731, built 1942), Hawthorn Leslie  Isabel (3437 of 1919), fireless Bagnall  No. 1 (2473 of 1932), Peckett  Whitehead (1163 of 1908?), and former Port of Bristol Portbury (Avonside 1764 of 1917) and Henbury (Peckett 1940 of 1937) which are now on the Bristol Harbour Railway.

Diesel

DMU
 BR Class 103 Nos. W50413 and W56169, Now at the Helston Railway

Coaches
Most trains are formed from British Rail Mark 1 coaches. Most used to be painted in a chocolate and cream livery based on the most familiar one used by the GWR but with WSR crests before 2016. However, from 2016, carmine and cream (or 'blood and custard') colours has been introduced for air braked stock, and newly painted chocolate and cream coaches appeared with British Railways emblems. Some coaches have been repainted in British Railways maroon since 2019.

The 'Quantock Belle' dining train was re-painted in early 2020 from a Pullman-based livery to BR Maroon. Each coach was formerly named in Pullman car style prior to 2020:, however upon the repaint all names were dropped.

Work is underway to restore a set of Great Western Railway coaches for use on the railway. Among those that are restored, or likely to be in the next few years are:

Goods wagons

Freight wagons are classified as either 'operational' for use in engineering trains, 'heritage' which are suitable for use in a demonstration heritage freight train that is used on special occasions, or 'museum' if only allowed to run short distances.

References

External links
 4160 History

Rolling stock
West Somerset Railway
West Somerset Railway